Paraptenodytes is an extinct genus of penguins which contains two or three species sized between a Magellanic penguin and an emperor penguin (Aptenodytes forsteri). They are known from fossil bones ranging from a partial skeleton and some additional material in the case of P. antarcticus, the type specimen for the genus, and a single humerus in the case of P. brodkorbi. The latter species is therefore often considered invalid; a recent study considers it indeed valid, but distinct enough not to belong into Paraptenodytes. The fossils were found in the Santa Cruz and Chubut Provinces of Patagonia, Argentina, in the Gaiman, Monte León and Santa Cruz Formations of Early to Middle Miocene age. Later occurrences are apparently from Late Miocene or possibly even Early Pliocene deposits.

Together with the related genus Arthrodytes, they form the subfamily Paraptenodytinae, which is not an ancestor of modern penguins.

References

Bibliography 
 Bertelli, Sara; Giannini, Norberto P. & Ksepka, Daniel T. (2006): Redescription and Phylogenetic Position of the Early Miocene Penguin Paraptenodytes antarcticus from Patagonia. American Museum Novitates 3525: 1-36. DOI: 10.1206/0003-0082(2006)3525[1:RAPPOT]2.0.CO;2 PDF fulltext
 Stucchi, Marcelo; Urbina, Mario & Giraldo, Alfredo (2003): Una nueva especie de Spheniscidae del Mioceno Tardío de la Formación Pisco, Perú. Bulletin Institut Français d'Études Andines 32(2): 361–375. PDF fulltext

Further reading 
 Ameghino, Florentino (1891): Enumeración de las aves fósiles de la Repúiblica Argentina. Revista Argentina de Historia Natural 1: 441–445.
 Simpson, George Gaylord (1946): Fossil penguins. Bulletin of the American Museum of Natural History 87: 7-99. PDF fulltext
 Simpson, George Gaylord (1971): Conspectus of Patagonian fossil penguins. American Museum Novitates 2488: 1-37. PDF fulltext

 
Bird genera
Extinct penguins
Miocene birds of South America
Pliocene birds of South America
Laventan
Colloncuran
Friasian
Santacrucian
Colhuehuapian
Neogene Argentina
Fossils of Argentina
Gaiman Formation
Fossil taxa described in 1891
Taxa named by Florentino Ameghino